Nipon Goswami (3 September 1942 – 27 October 2022) was an Indian actor and theatre artist associated with Assamese-language films. He was one of the veteran actors of Assamese Film Industry. He started his acting career as a stage actor and later established himself as a film actor.

Personal life
Goswami was born on 3 September 1942 at Kolibari in Tezpur, Assam. His father Chandradhar Goswami was a famous actor and his mother Nirupama Goswami was a singer. He did his primary schooling at Kolibari LP School. After that, he moved to Tezpur Govt. HS School. He died after suffering from heart-related ailments on 27 October 2022, at the age of 80.

Acting career
After completing his B.A. he went to Calcutta for the interview at Pune Film Institute. In 1965, he went to Pune for his acting training. Subhash Ghai, Navin Nischol, Shatrughan Sinha etc. were his classmates.

Filmography
Goswami debuted in the Assamese film industry as a child artist in the movie Piyali Phukan, directed by Phani Sarma in 1957. As a lead actor, Sangram was his first Assamese film and a hit movie. His next movie Dr. Bezbaruah released in 1969 brought him recognition as a star to act in many movies in the coming years. He also acted in a few Hindi movies as a character actor.

Goswami was actively involved in mobile theatres, notably, Abaahan, Kohinoor, Hengul, and Shakuntala. He also appeared in few television serials like Writu aahe writu jaai'.

Assamese

Hindi

References

External links
 
 Promote regional cinema: Nipon Goswami to government
 Cine star Nipon Goswami joins Congress

1942 births
2022 deaths
Indian male stage actors
Indian male film actors
Assamese-language actors
Assamese actors
People from Tezpur
20th-century Indian male actors
21st-century Indian male actors
Male actors in Assamese cinema